The men's downhill competition of the 2014 Winter Olympics was held at Rosa Khutor Alpine Resort near Krasnaya Polyana, Russia, on 9 February at 11:15 MSK.

Summary
The defending champion was Didier Défago from Switzerland. Aksel Lund Svindal, silver medalist in 2010, and bronze medalist Bode Miller also participated, with Miller posting the best training time. None of the 2010 medalists returned to the podium.

Matthias Mayer of Austria won the gold medal, with Christof Innerhofer from Italy in second and Kjetil Jansrud from Norway taking bronze.

Third racer on the course was Carlo Janka, who took the early lead, soon pushed to the third position by Travis Ganong and immediately after him by Jansrud. Starting 11th, Mayer overtook Jansrud by 0.10 seconds, and Svindal was 0.19 behind Jansrud. Innerhofer was ahead of Mayer's pace in the first half of the course, but fell back and finished 0.06 seconds behind Mayer, pushing Jansrud to the bronze medal position. No competitor after Innerhofer, including Défago, finished in the top nine.

Results
The race was started at 11:15 local time, (UTC+4).

References

Downhill